Na Yai Am is a district (amphoe) in the western part of Chanthaburi province, eastern Thailand.

History
The district was created on 1 April 1992 by splitting off the five western tambons of Tha Mai district. It was upgraded to a full district on 5 December 1996.

Its name "Na Yai Am" directly translates as "grandma Am's rice field". This was because here in the past was the residence and rice field of an old woman named Yai Am (grandma Am) and a place where people passed by. Therefore called by name of the owner.

Geography
Neighbouring districts are (from the west clockwise) Klaeng of Rayong province, Kaeng Hang Maeo, and Tha Mai of Chanthaburi Province. To the southwest is the Gulf of Thailand.

Administration
The district is divided into six sub-districts (tambons), which are further subdivided into 67 villages (mubans). Na Yai Am is a township (thesaban tambon) which covers parts of tambon Na Yai Am. There are a further six tambon administrative organizations (TAO) responsible for the non-municipal areas.

References

External links
amphoe.com

Na Yai Am